Baby 81 is the fourth studio album by American rock band Black Rebel Motorcycle Club. It was released on April 27, 2007 in Germany, April 30 in Europe and on May 1 in the U.S.. The album features a harder, more raw sound compared with their previous record Howl. It was also a studio comeback for drummer Nick Jago who was unable to participate during the recordings of Howl (other than the last track recorded during the sessions, 'Promise'). A DualDisc edition of the album was set to be released on May 1 in the U.S.; however, it has since been canceled.

The album debuted at number 46 on the U.S. Billboard 200, selling about 14,000 copies in its first week.

The album title refers to Baby 81, a survivor of the 2004 Indian Ocean earthquake.

Track listing

Singles 
 Weapon Of Choice (April 16, 2007)
 b/w "666 Conducer" / "The Show's About To Begin" / "666 Conducer" (Acoustic)
 Berlin (July 30, 2007)
 b/w "Vision" / "20 Hours" / "Weapon Of Choice" (Alternate Video)
 See also: American X: Baby 81 Sessions EP

In popular culture
"Weapon of Choice" was featured in the bonus setlist in Guitar Hero: World Tour, Driver: San Francisco, and as downloadable content for Rock Band. It is also featured in the racing game Ferrari Challenge: Trofeo Pirelli. "Need Some Air" was featured in NASCAR 08. "Berlin" and "Weapon of Choice" were featured in Shaun White Snowboarding.
 
A short film was created for the American X track and can be found on the American X EP and the Live DVD released from the Baby 81 Tour.

Chart performance

References 

2007 albums
Black Rebel Motorcycle Club albums